Bernardo Tobar (born 5 January , 1951 in Popayán) is a Colombian former sport shooter who competed in the 1984 Summer Olympics, in the 1988 Summer Olympics, in the 1992 Summer Olympics, and in the 1996 Summer Olympics.

References

1951 births
Living people
Colombian male sport shooters
ISSF pistol shooters
Olympic shooters of Colombia
Shooters at the 1984 Summer Olympics
Shooters at the 1988 Summer Olympics
Shooters at the 1992 Summer Olympics
Shooters at the 1996 Summer Olympics
Shooters at the 1987 Pan American Games
Shooters at the 1991 Pan American Games
Shooters at the 1995 Pan American Games
Shooters at the 1999 Pan American Games
Pan American Games gold medalists for Colombia
Pan American Games bronze medalists for Colombia
Pan American Games medalists in shooting
Medalists at the 1991 Pan American Games
20th-century Colombian people
21st-century Colombian people